Ana Bogdan (born 25 November 1992) is a Romanian professional tennis player. Having made her tour debut in 2007, she peaked at No. 46 in the WTA rankings in October 2022.

Bogdan had a successful junior career, reaching world No. 2 on 5 January 2009.

Tennis career

2016: Grand Slam debut and first WTA semifinal
In May, she won her first ITF tournament of the year in Grado by defeating Susanne Celik in the final. In July, she qualified for the Bank of the West Classic. She won her first round match against Asia Muhammad before losing to Alison Riske in three sets in the second round. At her next tournament at Brasil Tennis Cup, she reached her first WTA Tour semifinal, defeating former world number 1, Jelena Jankovic along the way. At the US Open she made it out of qualifying and defeated her countrywoman, Sorana Cirstea, in the first round. This was her first main draw Grand Slam match win. In the second round, she lost to countrywoman Monica Niculescu in straight sets.

2017: Second WTA semifinal
At the Australian Open, Bogdan reached the main draw through qualifying, but was defeated in straight sets in the first round by Elena Vesnina. She also took part in the main draw of the French Open and Wimbledon for the first time in her career, winning her first-round match at Wimbledon against Duan Yingying in straight sets.
At the US Open, Bogdan reached the second round of the main draw, matching her result from 2016, but was defeated in three sets by Monica Niculescu.

2018: Australian Open third round, Top 70 debut
The Australian Open saw Bogdan reach her best career result at a Grand Slam, reaching the third round, upsetting 11th seed Kristina Mladenovic in straight sets in her first round match and Yulia Putintseva in the second. As a result she reached the top 100 for the first time in her career, at world No. 89 in the singles rankings. Bogdan then made the semifinals at both Monterrey (falling to Garbiñe Muguruza) and Bogotá. These results propelled her ranking into the top 70.

2019-2020: Out of top 100
At the beginning of the new season, Bogdan failed to qualify for the main stages at the Australian Open. She lost in the final qualifying round, against Ann Li. Bogdan had two match points in the second set, but lost the match in three sets. 

She also defeated world No. 38, Veronika Kudermetova, while playing for Romania in Fed Cup.

2021: First WTA Challenger final,  French Open third round

2022: First WTA final, Top 50 debut
She reached her first WTA final at the 2022 WTA Poland Open where she lost to fifth seed Caroline Garcia.

Seeded sixth at the 2022 Emilia-Romagna Open in Parma, she reached the semifinals where she was defeated by Mayar Sherif. As a result she reached the top 50 at world No. 46 on 3 October 2022.

2023: First WTA 1000 third round
She reached the third round at the 2023 Dubai Tennis Championships as a qualifier where she lost to third seed Jessica Pegula.

Personal life 
She is in a relationship with Romanian-Italian rally driver Simone Tempestini as of 2020. In November 2020, she tested positive for COVID-19.

Performance timelines

Only main-draw results in WTA Tour, Grand Slam tournaments, Fed Cup/Billie Jean King Cup and Olympic Games are included in win–loss records.

Singles
Current after the 2023 Dubai Open.

Doubles

WTA career finals

Singles: 1 (1 runner-up)

WTA Challenger finals

Singles: 2 (1 title, 1 runner-up)

ITF Circuit finals

Singles: 21 (14 titles, 7 runner–ups)

Doubles: 4 (1 title, 3 runner–ups)

Record against other players 
Bogdan's record against players who have been ranked in the top 10. Active players are in boldface.

Notes

References

External links

 
 	
 

1992 births
Living people
Romanian female tennis players
People from Sinaia